The Australian Shadows Awards are annual literary awards established by the Australian Horror Writers Association (AHWA) in 2005 to honour the best published works of horror fiction written or edited by an Australian/New Zealand/Oceania resident in the previous calendar year.

Awards criteria and history
Works are judged on their overall effect within the horror genre based on the author's skill, delivery, and the work's lasting resonance. Each year, a director is appointed by the AHWA to administer the award. Shortlists for each category are determined by a panel of judges, and the shortlisted nominees are announced in March/April every year.

From 2005 to 2008, the Australian Shadows Award evaluated novels, anthologies, and short stories against each other in a single category. In 2009, the award was expanded into three categories: Short Fiction, Long Fiction, and Edited Publication.

From 2011, the award was restructured to consist of five categories: Novel; Long Fiction (novellas and novelettes); Short Fiction (short stories); Collection (single author collections); and Edited Publication (anthologies and magazine issues). In 2013, the 'Long Fiction' award category was renamed 'Paul Haines Award for Long Fiction' in honour of New Zealand/Australian author Paul Haines.

The Australian Shadows Awards were sponsored by Altair Australia Books in its first two years, through the donation of two statuettes created by dark fantasy artist Brom (supplied by The Franklin Mint). Currently, winners of the awards receive a hand crafted trophy from the masters of the horror special effects industry, Nightshade FX.

Winners and nominees
In the below list, the years correspond to the year of the book's eligibility; the awards are always announced the following year. If the short story was originally published in an anthology with other stories rather than by itself or in a magazine, the anthology title and anthology publisher's name is included.

2005

Judges
 Guest judge: Kim Wilkins
 Award Director: Marty Young

Winner
 "Father Muerte and the Flesh", Lee Battersby, Aurealis #36Nominees
 "Pater Familias", Lee Battersby, Shadowed Realms #3
 Shadow Box, Shane Jiraiya Cummings & Angela Challis (eds) (Brimstone Press)
 "The Red Priest's Homecoming", Dirk Flinthart, Andromeda Spaceways Inflight Magazine #17
 The Grinding House, Kaaron Warren (CSFG Publishing)

2006
Judges
 Judging panel: David Schembri, Miranda Siemienowicz, Mark Smith-Briggs
 Guest judge: Robert Hood
 Award Director: Marty Young

Winner
 The Pilo Family Circus, Will Elliott (ABC Books)Nominees
 "Father Renoir's Hands", Lee Battersby, Through Soft Air (Prime Books)
 "The Dying Light", Deborah Biancotti, Eidolon I (Eidolon Books)
 "The Blow-Off", Stephen Dedman, Brutarian #47
 "The Bridal Bier", Carol Ryles, Eidolon I (Eidolon Books)

Honourable mentions
 "Silk and Pearls", K. J. Bishop, Shadowed Realms #9
 "The Cup of Nestor", Simon Brown (Ticonderoga Publications)
 Basic Black: Tales of Appropriate Fear, Terry Dowling (Cemetery Dance Publications)
 The Mother, Brett McBean (Lothian Books)

2007
Judges
 Judging panel: Shane Jiraiya Cummings, Gary Kemble, Mark Smith-Briggs
 Guest judge: Richard Harland
 Award Director: Kirstyn McDermott

Winner
 "Toother", Terry Dowling, Eclipse 1 (Night Shade Books)Nominees
 "Between the Memories", Matthew Chrulew, Aurealis #38/39
 "Subtle Invasion", David Conyers, The Black Book of Horror (Mortbury Press)
 "The Dark and What It Said", Rick Kennett, Andromeda Spaceways Inflight Magazine #28
 "There Was Darkness", Martin Livings, Fantastic Wonder Stories (Ticonderoga Publications)
 The Darkness Within, Jason Nahrung (Hachette Livre)

Honourable mentions
 The Spiraling Worm, David Conyers & John Sunseri (Chaosium)
 "Cooling the Crows", Kaaron Warren, In Bad Dreams (Eneit Press)
 "The Wildflowers", Marty Young, Fantastic Wonder Stories (Ticonderoga Publications)

2008
Judges
 Judging panel: Shane Jiraiya Cummings, Brett McBean, Chuck McKenzie
 Guest judge: Sarah Endacott
 Award Director: Kirstyn McDermott

Winner
 "The Claws of Native Ghosts", Lee Battersby, The Beast Within (Graveside Books)Nominees
 "This Way To The Exit", Sara Douglass, Dreaming Again (HarperVoyager)
 "Rick Gets A Job", Jason Fischer, Andromeda Spaceways Inflight Magazine #37
 "Lakeside", Christopher Green, Dreaming Again (HarperVoyager)
 "Her Collection of Intimacy", Paul Haines, Black: Australian Dark Culture #2

2009
Judges
 Judging panel: Craig Bezant, Stephanie Gunn, Chuck McKenzie
 Guest judges: Bill Congreve (Short Fiction), James Doig (Edited Publication), Martin Livings (Long Fiction)
 Award Director: Shane Jiraiya Cummings

Long Fiction
Winner
 Slights, Kaaron Warren (Angry Robot)Nominees
 A Book of Endings, Deborah Biancotti (Twelfth Planet Press)
 Red Queen, Honey Brown (Penguin Australia)
 "Wives", Paul Haines, X6 (Coeur de Lion Publishing)
 The Dead Path, Stephen M. Irwin (Hachette Australia)

Edited Publication
Winner
 Grants Pass, Jennifer Brozek & Amanda Pillar (Morrigan Books)Nominees
 Festive Fear, Stephen Clark (Tasmaniac Publications)
 Aurealis #42, Stuart Mayne (Chimaera Publications)

Short fiction
Winner
 "Six Suicides", Deborah Biancotti, A Book of Endings (Twelfth Planet Press)Nominees
 "The Emancipated Dance", Felicity Dowker, Midnight Echo #2
 "Busking", Jason Fischer, Midnight Echo #3
 "The Message", Andrew J. McKiernan, Midnight Echo #2
 "The Gaze Dogs of Nine Waterfalls", Kaaron Warren, Exotic Gothic 3, Ash-Tree Press

2010
Judges
 Judging panel: Craig Bezant, Stephanie Gunn, Jeff Ritchie
 Guest judges: Kaaron Warren (Short Fiction), Rocky Wood (Edited Publication), Chuck McKenzie (Long Fiction)
 Award Director: Shane Jiraiya Cummings

Long Fiction
Winner
 Under Stones, Bob Franklin (Affirm Press)Nominees
 Bleed, Peter M. Ball (Twelfth Planet Press)
 Guardian of the Dead, Karen Healy (Allen & Unwin)
 Madigan Mine, Kirstyn McDermott (Picador Australia)
 The Girl With No Hands, Angela Slatter (Ticonderoga Publications)

Edited Publication
Winner
 Macabre: A Journey through Australia's Darkest Fears, Angela Challis & Marty Young (eds) (Brimstone Press)Nominees
 Midnight Echo #4, Lee Battersby (ed) (Australian Horror Writers Association)
 Scary Kisses, Liz Grzyb (ed) (Ticonderoga Publications)
 Scenes From the Second Storey, Amanda Pillar & Pete Kempshall (eds) (Morrigan Books)

Short fiction
Winner
 "She Said", Kirstyn McDermott, Scenes from the Second Storey (Morrigan Books)Nominees
 "Bread and Circuses", Felicity Dowker, Scary Kisses (Ticonderoga Publications)
 "Brisneyland by Night", Angela Slatter, Sprawl (Twelfth Planet Press)
 "All The Clowns In Clowntown", Andrew J. McKiernan, Macabre: A Journey through Australia's Darkest Fears (Brimstone Press)
 "Dream Machine", David Conyers, Scenes from the Second Storey (Morrigan Books)

2011
Judges
 Judging panel: Marty Young, James A. Moore

Novel
Winner
 No awardHonourable mention
 The Broken Ones, Stephen M. Irwin (Random House)

Long Fiction
Winner
 "The Past is a Bridge Best Left Burnt", Paul Haines, The Last Days of Kali Yuga (Brimstone Press)Nominees
 "And the Dead Shall Outnumber the Living", Deborah Biancotti, Ishtar (Gilgamesh Press)
 "Sleeping and the Dead", Cat Sparks, Ishtar (Gilgamesh Press)
 "From the Teeth of Strange Children", Lisa L. Hannett, Bluegrass Symphony (Ticonderoga Publications)

Short fiction
Winner
 "Shovel Man Joe", Amanda J. Spedding, Shades of SentienceNominees
 "Out Hunting for Teeth", Joanne Anderton, Midnight Echo #6
 "The Sea at Night", Joanne Anderton, Dead Red Heart (Ticonderoga Publications)
 "Taking It for the Team", Tracie McBride, Dead Red Heart (Ticonderoga Publications)
 "The Wanderer in Darkness", Andrew J. McKiernan, Midnight Echo #6

Edited Publication
Winner
 'Dead Red Heart, Russell B. Farr (ed) (Ticonderoga Publications)Nominees
 More Scary Kisses, Liz Grzyb (ed) (Ticonderoga Publications)
 Midnight Echo #6, David Kernot, David Conyers and Jason Fischer (eds) (Australian Horror Writers Association)
 The Year's Best Fantasy and Horror, Liz Grzyb and Talie Helene (eds) (Ticonderoga Publications)

Collection
Winner
 Tales of Sin and Madness, Brett McBean (Thunderstorm Books/Legume Man Books)Nominees
 Bluegrass Symphony, Lisa L. Hannett (Ticonderoga Publications)
 The Last Days of Kali Yuga, Paul Haines (Brimstone Press)
 Matilda Told Such Dreadful Lies, Lucy Sussex (Ticonderoga Publications)
 Apocrypha Sequence, Shane Jiraiya Cummings (self-published)

2012
Judges
 Short Stories/Collections/Edited Works panel: Steve Gerlach, Greg Chapman, Stephen Clark
 Novels/Novellas panel: Gerry Huntman, Jenny Blackford, B. Michael Radburn

Novel
Winner
 Perfections, Kirstyn McDermott (Xoum Publishing)Nominees
 The Corpse Rat King, Lee Battersby (Angry Robot Books)
 Blood and Dust, Jason Nahrung (Xoum Publishing)

Long Fiction
Winner
 "Sky", Kaaron Warren, Through Splintered Walls (Twelfth Planet Press)Nominees
 "Critique", Daniel I. Russell (Dark Continents Publishing)
 "Escena de un Asesinato", Robert Hood, Exotic Gothic 4 (PS Publishing)

Short fiction
Winner
 "Birthday Suit", Martin Livings, Living with the Dead (Dark Prints Press)Nominees
 "To Wish On A Clockwork Heart", Felicity Dowker, Bread and Circuses (Ticonderoga Publications)
 "Pigroot Flat", Jason Fischer, Midnight Echo #8
 "Birthday Suit", Martin Livings, Living with the Dead (Dark Prints Press)
 "They Don't Know That We Know What They Know", Andrew J. McKiernan, Midnight Echo #8
 "Creek", Kaaron Warren, Through Splintered Walls (Twelfth Planet Press)
 "Mountain", Kaaron Warren, Through Splintered Walls (Twelfth Planet Press)
 "Road", Kaaron Warren, Through Splintered Walls (Twelfth Planet Press)
 "A Monstrous Touch", Marty Young, Dangers Untold (Alliteration Ink)

Edited Publication
Winner
 Surviving The End, Craig Bezant (Dark Prints Press)Nominees
 Cthulhu Unbound 3, David Conyers and Brian M. Sammons (eds) (Permuted Press)
 The Year's Best Australian Fantasy & Horror, Liz Grzyb and Talie Helene (eds) (Ticonderoga Publications)

Collection
Winner
 Through Splintered Walls, Kaaron Warren (Twelfth Planet Press)Nominees
 Bread and Circuses, Felicity Dowker (Ticonderoga Publications)
 Living With The Dead, Martin Livings (Dark Prints Press)

2013
Judges
 Short Stories/Collections/Edited Works panel: Steve Gerlach, Gitte Christensen, Lee Pletzers
 Novels/Novellas panel: Gerry Huntman, Geoff Brown, Chuck McKenzie

Novel
Winner
 809 Jacob Street, Marty Young (Black Beacon Books)Nominees
 Undead Kelly, Timothy Bowden (Severed Press)
 Topsiders, Scott Tyson (Legume Man Books)

Paul Haines Award for Long Fiction
Winner
 "The Unwanted Women of Surrey", Kaaron Warren, Queen Victoria's Book of Spells (Tor Books)Nominees
 "Soul Killer", Robert Hood, Zombies vs Robots: Diplomacy (IDW Publishing)
 "The Home For Broken Dolls", Kirstyn McDermott, Caution: Contains Small Parts (Twelfth Planet Press)

Short fiction
Winner
 "Caterpillars", Debbie Cowens, Baby Teeth - Bite Sized Tales of Terror (Paper Road Press)Nominees
 "Nip, Tuck, Zip, Pluck", John Paul Fitch, Psychopomp Volume 4 (Artifice Comics)
 "Fence Lines", Joanne Anderton, The Bone Chime Song and other stories (FableCroft Publishing)
 "The Nest", C. S. McMullen, Nightmare Magazine #12
 "The Dead Way", J. C. Hart, Baby Teeth - Bite Sized Tales of Terror (Paper Road Press)

Edited Publication
Winner
 Baby Teeth - Bite Sized Tales of Terror, Dan Rabarts and Lee Murray (eds) (Paper Road Press)Nominees
 Midnight Echo #9, Geoff Brown (ed) (Australian Horror Writers Association)
 A Killer Among Demons, Craig Bezant (ed) (Dark Prints Press)
 Star Quake 1, Sophie Yorkston (ed) (IFWG Publishing)

Collection
Winner
 The Bone Chime Song and other stories, Jo Anderton (FableCroft Publishing)Nominees
 There was no nominee shortlist in 2013.

2014
Judges
 Short Stories/Collections/Edited Works panel: Christine Ferdinands, Natalie Satakovski, B. R. de Loryn
 Novels/Novellas panel: Jay Caselberg (novellas only), Kathy Williams-DeVries, Lee Pletzers, B. R. de Loryn

Novel
Winner
 Wolf Creek: Origin, Aaron Sterns and Greg McLean (Penguin)Nominees
 Suicide Forest, Jeremy Bates (Ghillinnein Books)
 Book of the Dead, Greig Beck (Momentum Books)
 Dark Deceit, Lauren Dawes (Momentum Books)
 Davey Ribbon, Matthew Tait (HodgePodge Press)

Paul Haines Award for Long Fiction
Winner
 Dreams of Destruction, Shane Jiraiya Cummings (self-published)Nominees
 Ghost Camera, Darcy Coates (self-published)
 "The Shark God Covenant", Robert Hood, Dimension6 #3

Short fiction
Winner
 "Shadows of the Lonely Dead", Alan Baxter, Suspended in Dusk (Books of the Dead Press)Nominees
 "Mephisto", Alan Baxter, Daily Science Fiction
 "Mummified Monk", Rebecca Fung, Daylight Dims Volume 2
 "Bones", Michelle Jager, SQ Mag #14
 "Last Year When We Were Young", Andrew J. McKiernan, Last Year When We Were Young (Satalyte Publishing)

Edited Publication
Winner
 SQ Mag #14, Sophie Yorkston (ed) (IFWG Publishing)Nominees
 SNAFU, Geoff Brown and Amanda J. Spedding (eds) (Cohesion Press)
 Suspended in Dusk, Simon Dewar (ed) (Books of the Dead Press)

Collection
Winner
 Last Year When We Were Young, Andrew J. McKiernan (Satalyte Publishing)Nominees
 There was no nominee shortlist in 2014.

2015

The Paul Haines Award for Long Fiction
Winner
 In Vaulted Halls Entombed, Alan Baxter

Nominees
 The Haunting of Gillespie House, Darcy Coates
 Night Shift, Dirk Flinthart
 The Whimper, Robert Hood

Edited Works
Winner
 Blurring the Line, Marty YoungNominees
 Bloodlines, Amanda Pillar
 Lighthouses, Cameron Trost
 Midnight Echo 11, Kaaron Warren

Collected works
Winner
 Peripheral Visions: The Collected Ghost Stories, Rob HoodNominees
 The Abandonment of Grace and Everything After, Shane Jiraiya Cummings
 Cherry Crow Children, Deborah Kalin

Short fiction
Winner
 "Mine Intercom", Kaaron WarrenNominees
 "The Bone Maiden", Greg Chapman
 "Eight Seconds", Pandora Hope
 "El Caballo Muerte", Martin Livings
 "Perfect Little Stitches", Deborah Sheldon

Comics/Graphic Novels
Winner
 The Road to Golgotha, G. N. Braun & Amanda J. SpeddingNominees
 Troll, Michael Michalandos
 The Monster, Ben Rosenthal
 Undad, Shane W. Smith

The Rocky Wood Award for Non-fiction and Criticism
Winner
 The Literary Gothic, Marija Elektra RodriguezNovels
Winner
 The Catacombs, Jeremy BatesNominees
 The Haunting of Blackwood House, Darcy Coates
 The Transgressions Cycle: The Mother, Mike Jones
 The Transgressions Cycle: The Reparation, Mike Jones
 The Big Smoke, Jason Nahrung

2016
Award Director: Claire Fitzpatrick

Short fiction
Winner
 "His Shining Day", Richard Harland (Dreaming in the Dark)Nominees
 "D Is for Death", Pete Aldin (C is for Chimera)
 "Midnight in the Graffiti Tunnel", Terry Dowling (Dreaming in the Dark)
 "Protege", Anthony Ferguson (Monsters Among Us)
 "No Other Men in Mitchell", Rose Hartley (Nightmare 2/16)
 "Selfie", Lee Murray (SQ Mag 5/16)
 "What the Sea Wants", Deb Sheldon (SQ Mag 2/16)
 "Uncontainable", Helen Stubbs (Apex Magazine 12/16)
 "All Roll Over", Kaaron Warren (In Your Face)
 "Fade to Grey", Janeen Webb (Dreaming in the Dark)

Collected works
Winner
 Crow Shine, Alan Baxter (Ticonderoga)Nominees
 Concentration, Jack Dann (PS)
 Everything Is Fine, Grant Stone (Racket House)

Edited Work
Winner
 Dead of Night, Shane Jiraiya Cummings, ed. (Australian Horror Writers Association)Nominees
 Dreaming in the Dark, Jack Dann, ed. (PS Australia)
 At the Edg'e, Dan Rabarts & Lee Murray, eds. (Paper Road)

Novel
Winner
 The Grief Hole, Kaaron Warren (IFWG)Nominees
 Hollow House, Greg Chapman (Omnium Gatherum)
 The Devil’s Prayer, Luke Gracias (self-published)
 Presumed Dead, Rick Kennett (self-published)
 The Invasion, Brett McBean (Sinister Grin)
 Into the Mist, Lee Murray (Cohesion)
 Unbidden, TJ Park (HarperImpulse)
 Devil Dragon, Deborah Sheldon (Severed)

Paul Haines Award for Long Fiction
Winner
 "Tipuna Tapu", Dan Rabarts (And Then…: The Great Big Book of Awesome Adventure Tales, Vol I)Nominees
 "Box Of Bones", Jeremy Bates (Ghillinnein)
 "Served Cold", Alan Baxter (Dreaming in the Dark)
 "The Eschatologist", Greg Chapman (Voodoo)
 "The Heart of the Mission", Matthew R. Davis (Oz Horror Con)
 "Burnt Sugar", Kirstyn McDermott (Dreaming in the Dark)

2017
Award Director: J. Ashley Smith

The Rocky Wood Award for Non-Fiction and Criticism
Winner
 The Body Horror Book, Claire Fitzpatrick (Oscillate Wildly Press)Nominees
 "101 Weird Writers #46 – Ryūnosuke Akutagawa", Kat Clay (Weird Fiction Review)
 Literary Serial Killer Fiction: The Evolution of a Genre, William Cook (Victoria University, Wellington NZ)
 It Follows is the Millennial STD Parable of Our Time, Maria Lewis (SBS)
 "A Shared Ambition: Horror Writers in Horror Fiction", Kyla Lee Ward (AHWA, Midnight Echo #12)

Written Work in a Comic/Graphic Novel
No award.

Edited Work
Winner
 Cthulhu Deep Down Under Volume 1, Steve Proposch, Christopher Sequeira & Bryce J. Stevens (IFWG Publishing)Nominees
 Midnight Echo #12, Shane Jiraiya Cummings & Anthony P. Ferguson (AHWA)
 Below the Stairs – Tales from the Cellar, Steven Dillon (Things in the Well)

Collected Work
Winner
 Perfect Little Stitches and Other Stories, Deborah Sheldon (IFWG Publishing)Nominees
 Singing My Sister Down and Other Stories, Margo Lanagan (Allen & Unwin)

Short fiction
Winner
 "The Banksia Boys", Matthew J. Morrison (Andromeda Spaceways Inflight Magazine #66)Nominees
 "Outside a Drifter", Lisa L. Hannett (Looming Low Vol.1, Dim Shores Press)
 "The Hand Walker", Rue Karney (Pacific Monsters, Fox Spirit Press)
 "The Circle Line", Martin Livings (Between the Tracks, Things in the Well)
 "The Little Mermaid", in Passing, Angela Slatter (The Review of Australian Fiction, April 2017)
 "The Big Reveal", David Stevens (Kaleidotrope)

The Paul Haines Award for Long Fiction
Winner
 "Ismail's Expulsion", Brian Craddock (Between the Tracks, Things in the Well)Nominees
 "Hope and Walker", Andrew Cull (Vermillion2One)
 "This Impossible Gift", Matthew R. Davis (Midnight Echo #12, AHWA)
 "No Good Deed", Angela Slatter (New Fears, Titan Books)
 "Furtherest", Kaaron Warren (Dark Screams Vol. 7, Cemetery Dance)
 "Eden in the End", Ashlee Scheuerman (Perpetual Motion Machine Publishing)

Novel
Winner
 Corpselight (Verity Fassbinder Book 2), Angela Slatter (Jo Fletcher Books)Nominees
 Aletheia, J. S. Breukelaar (Crystal Lake Publishing)
 Slithers, W. W. Mortensen (Self Published)
 Soon, Lois Murphy (Transit Lounge)
 Providence Place, Matthew Tait (Dark Crib Publications)

2018
Award Director: Silvia Brown

Poetry
Winner
 "Revenants of the Antipodes", Kyla Lee Ward (HWA Poetry Showcase, Volume V)Nominees
 "Polarity", Jay Caselberg (The Literary Hatchet 8-9/18)
 "The Middle of the Night", Rebecca Fraser (Breach #09)
 "Your Mortician Knows", Bee Nielsen (A Little Ray of Obsidian Black)
 "Matinee", Hester J. Rook (Chrome Baby 4/12/18)

Written Work in a Comic/Graphic Novel
Winner
 The Demon: Hell is Earth, Andrew Constant, Brad Walker, Andrew Hennessy & Chris Sotomayor (DC)Edited Work
Winner
 Hellhole: An Anthology of Subterranean Horror, Lee Murray, ed. (Adrenaline)Nominees
 Behind the Mask, Steve Dillon, ed. (Oz Horror Con)
 Cthulhu: Land of the Long White Cloud and Cthulhu Deep Down Under, Volume 2, Steve Proposch, Christopher Sequeira & Bryce J. Stevens, eds. (IFWG)

Collected Work
Winner
 Shadows on the Wall, Steven Paulsen (IFWG Publishing)Nominees
 Singing My Sister Down and Other Stories, Margo Lanagan (Allen & Unwin)
 Bones, Andrew Cull (Vermillion2One)
 The Dalziel Files, Brian Craddock (Broken Puppet Books)
 Exploring Dark Fiction #2: A Primer to Kaaron Warren, Eric J. Guignard, ed. (Dark Moon)
 Beneath the Ferny Tree, David Schembri (Close-Up)

Short fiction
Winner
 "Riptide", Dan Rabarts (Suspended in Dusk II)Nominees
 "The House of Jack’s Girls", Lee Battersby (PseudoPod 10/12/18)
 "The Ward of Tindalos", Debbie Cowens & Matt Cowens (Cthulhu: Land of the Long White Cloud)
 "Planned and Expected", Piper Mejia (Breach #09)
 "Slither", Jason Nahrung (Cthulhu Deep Down Under, Volume 2)

The Paul Haines Award for Long Fiction
Winner
 "The Black Sea", Chris Mason (Beneath the Waves: Tales from the Deep)Nominees
 "Time and Tide", Robert Hood (Cthulhu Deep Down Under, Volume 2)
 "Thylacines", Deborah Sheldon (Severed)
 "Love Thee Better", Kaaron Warren (Creatures: The Legacy of Frankenstein)

Novel
Winner
 Tide of Stone, Kaaron Warren (Omnium Gatherum)'Nominees
 Devouring Dark, Alan Baxter (Grey Matter)
 Teeth of the Wolf, Dan Rabarts & Lee Murray (Raw Dog Screaming)
 Contrition'', Deborah Sheldon (IFWG)

References
General
 Australian Horror Writers Association "Australian Shadows Awards" (Accessed 2 May 2015).
 Australian Horror Writers Association Facebook page (Accessed 2 May 2015).
 Crabb, Brendan. (30 April 2015). "Shadows of the Lonely Dead picks up award for Jamberoo author Alan Baxter" Kiama Independent.
2009 Australian Shadows Award: Finalists (Accessed 16 May 2010).
"News: Australian Shadows Award Expands". HorrorScope (Accessed 12 September 2009).
"News: Australian Shadows finalists". HorrorScope (Accessed 14 February 2009).
Kemble, Gary. (17 March 2007). "Elliott wins Australian Shadows award". ABC online news (Articulate).
Kemble, Gary. (13 March 2009). "Lee Battersby Snares 2nd Australian Shadows Award" ABC News (Articulate). (Accessed 21 March 2009).
Siemienowicz, Miranda (16 March 2007). "News: Australian Shadows winner announced". HorrorScope
(10 June 2019) "2018 Australian Shadows Awards Winners". Locus Mag

External links
Australian Shadows Awards page of AHWA website
Australian Shadows Facebook page

Australian literary awards
Awards established in 2005